This page provides summaries to the 2004 COSAFA Cup.

First round
Winners of the first round advanced to the quarter-finals.

Quarter-finals
The four quarter-finalists of the 2003 edition Zimbabwe, Malawi, Zambia and Swaziland received byes into quarter-finals.

 Note: † The match between Swaziland and Zimbabwe was abandoned at 0–5 in 83' following crowd trouble; the result stood.

Semi-finals

Final
The final was originally planned for two legs but was reduced to one match for unknown reasons.

External links
 Details at RSSSF archives

COSAFA Cup
Cosafa Cup, 2004